Sheopur District is a district of Madhya Pradesh state in central India. The district is located in the north of the state and forms part of Chambal division. It is situated on the periphery of Rajasthan, which shows in the influence of Rajasthani culture in this district.

The town of Sheopur is the district headquarters. Other towns include Bijeypur, Karahal and Badoda. The district has a population of 687,861 (2011 census) and covers an area of 6,606 km². It is the third least populous district of Madhya Pradesh (out of 50), after Harda and Umaria. It is one out of 21 tribal districts of Madhya Pradesh.

Geography 
Sheopur district is located in the north of Madhya Pradesh in the Chambal division. It is bordered by Morena district to the north, Gwalior district to the east, Shivpuri district to the southeast, and Rajasthan to the south and northwest.

The region is chiefly marked by the presence of the Chambal ravines - the Chambal river marks the border with Rajasthan. Southeast of the Chambal is a plateau region which leads to a range of forested hills in the east of the district where lies Kuno Wildlife Sanctuary.

History
The town of Sheopur and its fort was said to have been founded by Indra Singh of the Gaur Rajputs, feudatories of Jaipur, in 1537. The first historical mention of the region occurs thanks to Nimat Ullah, who recorded an expedition of SIkander Lodhi in support of Raj Dungar who later converted to Islam. Sheopur surrendered to Akbar when he was advancing towards Chittor. Later it was made headquarters of a mahal in Ranthambore Sarkar. In 1808, it was conquered by Daulat Rao Scindia of Gwalior who gave it to his general Jean Baptiste Filose as a jagir. Filose managed to starve out the Gaurs remaining in the fort, who left in 1809. Under Daulat Rao, the town was a mint. While Filose was raiding adjoining territory of Jai Singh of Raghogarh, Singh captured the fort and his family. After 1818, Filose retired to Sheopur as his jagir. Sheopur continued as a part of Gwalior state until 1947 when it became part of independent India. In 1956, it was merged with the remainder of Madhya Pradesh. Sheopur district was carved out of Morena District in 1998.

Economy
In 2006 the Ministry of Panchayati Raj named Sheopur one of the country's 250 most backward districts (out of a total of 640). It is one of the 24 districts in Madhya Pradesh currently receiving funds from the Backward Regions Grant Fund Programme (BRGF).

Divisions
The district comprises three sub-divisions: Sheopur, Vijaypur and Karahal. Sheopur sub-division consists two tehsils: Sheopur and Baroda. Vijaypur sub-division also comprises two tehsils: Vijaypur and Veerpur. Karahal sub-division comprises the lone tehsil of Karahal. There are two nagar palikas in this district: Sheopur and Baroda and a nagar panchayat, Vijaypur.

There are two Vidhan Sabha constituencies in this district, namely, Sheopur and Vijaypur. Both of these are part of Morena Lok Sabha constituency.

Demographics

According to the 2011 census Sheopur District has a population of 687,861, roughly equal to the nation of Equatorial Guinea or the US state of North Dakota. This gives it a ranking of 505th in India (out of a total of 640). Its population growth rate over the decade 2001-2011 was 22.96%. Sheopur has a sex ratio of 902 females for every 1,000 males, and a literacy rate of 58.02%. 15.61% of the population live in urban areas. Scheduled Castes and Scheduled Tribes make up 15.76% and 23.47% of the population respectively. The Saharia are the main tribe in the area.

At the time of the 2011 Census of India, 94.27% of the population in the district spoke Hindi, 2.02% Urdu, 1.73% Handuri and 0.91% Punjabi as their first language.

See also
 Bamulia
 Kuno Wildlife Sanctuary
 Morena (Lok Sabha constituency)

References

External links

Sheopur District website

 
Districts of Madhya Pradesh
1998 establishments in Madhya Pradesh